The Russ Manning Most Promising Newcomer Award is an American award presented to a comic book artist whose first professional work appeared within the previous two years. It was named after comic book artist Russ Manning. The winner is chosen from a list of nominees picked by judges from the West Coast Comics Club and Comic-Con International, and is given at the annual Eisner Award ceremony.

Winners
Source:
 1982 Dave Stevens
 1983 Jan Duursema
 1984 Steve Rude
 1985 Scott McCloud
 1986 Art Adams
 1987 Eric Shanower
 1988 Kevin Maguire
 1989 Richard Piers Rayner
 1990 Dan Brereton
 1991 Dærick Gröss
 1992 Mike Okamoto
 1993 Jeff Smith
 1994 Gene Ha
 1995 Edvin Biuković
 1996 Alexander Maleev
 1997 Walt Holcomb
 1998 Matt VanderPol
 1999 Jay Anacleto
 2000 Alan Bunce
 2001 Goran Sudžuka
 2002 Tan Eng Huat
 2003 Jerome Opeña
 2004 Eric Wight
 2005 Chris Bailey
 2006 R. Kikuo Johnson
 2007 David Petersen
 2008 Cathy Malkasian
 2009 Eleanor Davis
 2010 Marian Churchland
 2011 Nate Simpson
 2012 Tyler Crook
 2013 Russel Roehling
 2014 Aaron Conley
 2015 (Tie)
Jorge Corona 
Greg Smallwood
 2016 Dan Mora
 2017 Anne Szabla
 2018 (Tie)
Hamish Steele 
Pablo Tunica
 2019 Lorena Alvarez
2022 Luana Vecchio

See also
Alley Award
Bill Finger Award
Eagle Award
Eisner Award
Harvey Award
Inkpot Award
Kirby Award
National Comics Award
Shazam Award

References

Russ Manning Award